Cyrtandra paludosa is a species of flowering plant in the family Gesneriaceae, native to Hawaii. It is found on all the Hawaiian islands except Lanai.

Subtaxa
The following varieties are accepted:
Cyrtandra paludosa var. microcarpa 
Cyrtandra paludosa var. paludosa

References

paludosa
Endemic flora of Hawaii
Plants described in 1829
Taxa named by Charles Gaudichaud-Beaupré
Flora without expected TNC conservation status